Muskoka and Parry Sound was a federal electoral district represented in the House of Commons of Canada from 1883 to 1904. It was located in the province of Ontario. This riding was created from parts of Algoma and Muskoka ridings.

It consisted of the townships of Watt, Cardwell, Humphrey, Conger, Stephenson, Brunel, Franklin, Sinclair, Chaffey, Bethune, Perry, Proud foot, Foley, Cowper, McDougall, Parry Sound Village and Island, Fergusson, Carling, Burpee, Shawanaga and settlements on the lake shore to the mouth of French River, Christie, Monteith, McKellar, Hagerman, Spence, Croft, McKenzie, Ferrie, Wilson, Mills, McConkey, Hardy, Chapman, Strong, Magnetawan, Joly, Lount, Machar, Laurier, Ryerson, Armour, McMurrich, Stisted, Pringle, Gurd, Himsworth, Nipissing, Burton, Gibson, Harrison, Wallbridge, Patterson, Blair, Mowat, and Brown, and 
the part of the territorial district of Muskoka lying to the south of the township of Conger and east of the townships of Medora and Wood.

The electoral district was abolished in 1903 when it was merged into a new Muskoka riding.

Electoral history

|}

|}

|}

 

|}

See also 

 List of Canadian federal electoral districts
 Past Canadian electoral districts

External links 

 Website of the Library of Parliament website

Former federal electoral districts of Ontario